Anthurium dwyeri is a species of plant in the genus Anthurium native from Costa Rica to the Chocó Department of Colombia. Named in honor of the botanist Dr John D. Dwyer, it has no known close relatives but is a member of the section Porphyrochitonium.

References

dwyeri
Plants described in 1981